Shuishiying were the camp sites or office buildings of the Naval Forces during the later days of the Qing Dynasty of China.

The most famous Shuishiying was in Lüshunkou District, Dalian, Liaoning, where the ceasefire treaty of the Battle of Lüshun was signed between Anatoly Stessel and Maresuke Nogi, representing Russia and Japan respectively, in 1905, during the Russo-Japanese War.

See also
 Dalian
 Lüshunkou District
 Russo-Japanese War

External links
 Shuishiying during the Qing Dynasty (in Chinese)

History of Dalian
Russo-Japanese War
Military history of the Qing dynasty
Naval history of China